("Weekly Quotation of the Nazi Party") was a wall newspaper published by the Nazi Party between 1937 and 1944, displaying quotations, mostly from Nazi leaders. About 1,100 issues were published. Along with Nazi leaders, the posters also quoted famous Germans from history, including Ludwig van Beethoven, Carl von Clausewitz, Otto von Bismarck, and Friedrich Schiller. The posters were displayed in many public locations including town halls, restaurants, doctor's offices, offices, schools or companies. Historian Jeffrey Herf estimates that 32.5 million copies were printed in total from September 1939 to when the periodical was discontinued.

The purpose of the publication was to educate Germans about Nazi ideals and values, especially those who did not take advantage of the party's indoctrination sessions. Initially, they were often printed in Fraktur type, but this changed in later editions. Anti-Nazi diarist Friedrich Kellner noted that it was printed on high-quality paper despite shortages which necessitated rationing.

On 5 March 1939, the  quoted Heinrich von Kleist as saying, "As long as a single enemy defiantly resists in Germany, my duty is hatred and my virtue revenge!"

In 2010 Austrian blogger Helge Fahrnberger compared the  poster of 21 November 1938 (shortly after ), which read "A people who keep their blood free from the Jews will live forever" with anti-immigration posters produced by the Freedom Party of Austria. Martin Graf publicly disagreed with this assessment, stating that it was reasonable to argue that "Too much foreignness is not good for anyone."

References

Further reading

External links

60 of the posters at Internet Archive

 
Nazi newspapers
1937 establishments in Germany
1944 disestablishments in Germany
Quotations